The Geroch energy or Geroch mass is one of the possible definitions of mass in general relativity.  It can be derived from the Hawking energy, itself a measure of the bending of ingoing and outgoing rays of light that are orthogonal to a 2-sphere surrounding the region of space whose mass is to be defined, by leaving out certain (positive) terms related to the sphere's external and internal curvature.

The equation for the mass of a 2-sphere is based on the equation for the ingoing and outgoing ray of light corresponding to an electron on its surface, expressed as: γ = 2 γ. The inverse of this equation represents the value of the Hawking energy , and the result is the mass of an entangled pair of photons: the two photons can not be entangled if only they are located at the same location on the surface. But in this case, both photons must be propagating simultaneously. So the two photons, or their antiparticles, must be travelling through a field that is 3-dimensional, and the field can be regarded as containing the mass of another point.

See also

Mass in general relativity
Robert Geroch

References

General relativity
Mass